The  is a Buddhist temple located in the Yawata neighborhood of the city of Toyokawa, Aichi, Japan. It is the modern successor of one of the provincial temples established by Emperor Shōmu during the Nara period (710–794) for the purpose of promoting Buddhism as the national religion of Japan and standardising control of Yamato rule over the provinces.

The site of the original temple, 400 meters to the northeast of the modern temple, was designated as a National Historic Site in 1922.

History

The exact date that the Mikawa Kokubun-ji was founded is not known. It was long assumed that the temple was constructed in 741 as the provincial temple of Mikawa Province; however, recent excavations indicate that the pagoda was erected before the other structures in the temple. This implies that a temple already existed on this site, but was remodeled  accordance with the standardized Shichidō garan formation, similar to Tōdai-ji in Nara, upon which the kokubunji temples were based, at some later date. The temple's bell is estimated to date to the early Heian period.

The layout of the original temple was 180 meters square, and it was originally surrounded by an earthen wall. Archaeological excavations have discovered the foundations of the South Gate, Central Gate, Kondō and Lecture Hall, as wells as the foundations of the surrounding cloister.  The 16.8 meters square  foundation stones for the pagoda have been exposed since antiquity. No roof tiles have been found at the site, indicating that the original temple had hinoki shingles instead of tiles.

Per the Engishiki records, the temple was allowed a revenue of 20,000 koku of rice land for its upkeep in 927 AD.  Subsequent changes to the temple are unclear, and the temple appears to have been abandoned around the end of the 10th century.

The Mikawa Kokubun-ji was restored during the Eishō era (1504-1521) of the Sengoku period under the sponsorship of the Imagawa clan, and the temple was renamed the Hachiman Kokubun-ji, indicating a connection with a nearby Hachiman shrine. The reconstructed temple belongs to the Sōtō sect of Japanese Zen. In 1649, under the Tokugawa shogunate, the temple had an assigned kokudaka of over five koku for its upkeep.

The grounds of the temple were excavated from 1985-1988 and from 2007-2009. It is located about 20 minutes on foot from Kokufu Station on the Meitetsu Nagoya Main Line.

Cultural Properties

Important cultural properties

Bell
The bronze bell at the Mikawa Kokubun-ji dates from the early Heian period and was designated an Important Cultural Property of Japan in 1922. The bell is unsigned, and has a height of 118 cm, circumference of 256 cm, opening of 82.4 cm and a weight of 687 kilograms.

Gallery

See also
List of Historic Sites of Japan (Aichi)
provincial temple

References

External links

 Toyokawa City home page

Historic Sites of Japan
Toyokawa, Aichi
Mikawa Province
8th-century establishments in Japan
Nara period
Buddhist archaeological sites in Japan
Soto temples